SYBR Safe is a cyanine dye used as a nucleic acid stain in molecular biology. SYBR Safe is one of a number of SYBR dyes made by the Life Technologies Corporation. SYBR Safe binds to DNA. The resulting DNA-dye-complex absorbs blue light (λmax = 509 nm) and emits green light (λmax = 524 nm).

Safety
SYBR Safe is marketed as a safer alternative to ethidium bromide. However, as the molecule itself is quite a bit larger than ethidium bromide, it does not bind to the column of a gel extraction as easily, making it less efficient when trying to clone a DNA fragment into a plasmid.
SYBR Safe has a very similar structure to thiazole orange, which has a methyl group attached to the charged nitrogen, whereas SYBR Safe has an N-propyl group.  Thiazole Orange has been shown to be three to four times less mutagenic than ethidium bromide whereas SYBR Safe is four to five times less mutagenic.  Additionally, according to the Life Technologies website, SYBR Safe is not lethal in rats at doses as high as 5 g/kg, and rats don't show symptoms of acute toxicity.  Thiazole orange does show toxicity at this dose.

Similar cyanine dyes 

 TO (Thiazole Orange)
 SYBR Green I
 SYBR Green II
 SYBR Gold
 YO (Oxazole Yellow)
 PG (PicoGreen)

See also 

 GelGreen - competing product with a different molecular structure and size

Notes and references 

Staining dyes
Cyanine dyes
Benzothiazoles
Quinolines